Liceo Elvira Sánchez de Garcés is a Chilean high school located in Mostazal, Cachapoal Province, Chile. This mission of Liceo Elvira Sánchez de Garcés was to offer children in the sector of La Punta a place of education that was close to their place of living. It was founded as a public school in the year 1919.

Between the years 1958 to 1968, technical courses were added to the curriculum to allow for a Vocational Degree, such as in sewing and fashion.

References 

Educational institutions established in 1919
Secondary schools in Chile
Schools in Cachapoal Province
1919 establishments in Chile